Luis Silva may refer to:

Sports
Luis Silva (Mexican footballer) (born 1988), Mexican footballer
Luís Silva (footballer, born 1992), Portuguese football midfielder
Luís Silva (footballer, born 1999), Portuguese football defender
Luís Silva (boccia) (born 1980), Portuguese boccia player
Luís Silva (fencer) (born 1972), Portuguese fencer
Luis Silva (swimmer), Brazilian paralympic swimmer
Luis Carlos Cardoso da Silva (born 1984), Brazilian paracanoeist

Others
Luis Silva Parra (1931–2015), Ecuadorian saxophonist
Luis Silva (songwriter) (1943–2008), American Tejano songwriter
Luis Silva (comedian) (born 1978), Cuban comedian
Luís Filipe Silva (born 1969), Portuguese writer of science fiction

See also
Luiz Silva Filho (born 1983), Brazilian football goalkeeper